Tatiana Caicedo Muñoz (born 26 March 1998) is a Colombian female badminton player.

Achievements

BWF International Challenge/Series
Mixed Doubles

 BWF International Challenge tournament
 BWF International Series tournament
 BWF Future Series tournament

References

External links
 

1998 births
Living people
Colombian female badminton players
21st-century Colombian women